Visions: How Science Will Revolutionize the 21st Century is a popular science book by Michio Kaku first published in 1997. In Visions, Kaku examines the great scientific revolutions that have dramatically reshaped the twentieth century, namely quantum mechanics, biotechnology, and artificial intelligence and shows how they will change and alter science and the way we live.

References

Popular science books
1997 non-fiction books
Doubleday (publisher) books